Dragan Pavlović Latas (born 1960 in Skopje) is a Macedonian journalist of Serbian descent. Dragan Pavlović Latas has the managing editor of the national TV Sitel, and daily newspaper Večer and was elected the country's Journalist Of The Year in 1995, 1998, 2000, 2001 and 2002. He was president of the Association of Commercial Radio & TV Broadcast (1995–1998) and General Secretary of the Macedonian Association of Journalists (2002–2007 and from 2011-). He was accused of cooperating with the Serbian secret service during the Yugoslav Wars. Macedonian daily newspaper Vreme (Time) has published a formerly secret documents, which show that in  1999 Dragan Pavlovic-Latas organized the attack on the US embassy, on behalf of Yugoslavia's State Security Service. The document containing information on Latas's contact with a Serbian Intelligence officer and in which he appears to be receiving an order to contact other members of the Serbian community in the country to organize a protest in front of the US embassy that would appear spontaneous. The US embassy would be turned to ashes, Latas allegedly replied, according to the document.

References

Writers from Skopje
1960 births
Living people
Macedonian people of Serbian descent